This is a list of episodes from the twelfth and final season of Hawaii Five-O. Season 12 was the first to not feature actor James MacArthur as investigator Danny Williams.  MacArthur appeared in all previous 11 seasons.

Broadcast history
The season originally aired Thursdays at 9:00-10:00 pm (EST) from October 4 to November 29, 1979, Tuesdays at 9:00-10:00 pm (EST) from December 4, 1979 to January 15, 1980 and Saturdays at 9:00-10:00 pm (EST) from March 1 to April 5, 1980

DVD release
The season was released on DVD by Paramount Home Video.

Episodes

References

12
1979 American television seasons
1980 American television seasons